Je suis une célébrité, sortez-moi de là ! is a French television reality show presented by Jean-Pierre Foucault and Christophe Dechavanne in season 1, and Laurence Boccolini in season 2. It was broadcast on TF1 from 14 April 2006 to 28 April 2006. It is the French version of the international reality show I'm a Celebrity...Get Me Out of Here!. The first season was broadcast live in the early evening from Teresópolis in Brazil. The second season aired in the summer of 2019.

Series overview
Winners crowned King or Queen of their respective year.

Key:
 King of the Jungle
 Queen of the Jungle

Series results

Key
 Winner – King or Queen of the Jungle
 Runner-up
 Third place
 Late arrival
 Evicted
 Withdrew

Season 1 (2006)

12 contestants participated in series 1.

Season 2 (2019)

11 contestants (5 women and 6 men) participated in series 2.

External links

2000s French television series
2006 French television series debuts
France
French reality television series